Ölüm Yolu is a 1985 Turkish adventure film, directed by Halit Refiğ and starring Kadir Inanir, Hülya Avsar, and Tanju Gürsu.

References

External links
Ölüm Yolu at the Internet Movie Database

1985 films
Turkish adventure films
1980s adventure films
Films directed by Halit Refiğ